Nikos Christodoulou (born 1959) is a Greek conductor and composer, and the music director of the City of Athens Symphony Orchestra and Choir.

He is also the founder of the New Symphony Orchestra of Athens and the Euro Youth Philharmonic.

Biography 

Nikos Christodoulou studied composition in Athens with J.A. Papaioannou and the piano. He furthered his composition studies at the Hochschule für Musik in Munich, and his conducting studies at the Royal College of Music in London.

From 1977 to 1981, Nikos Christodoulou was an associate composer and adviser at Greek National Radio.

Among other symphonic works he conducts Skalkottas, which he has recorded. He was also a teacher at the Hellenic Conservatory, and makes regular appearances at the Greek National Opera. He led the first Helios Festival, a tribute event dedicated to Carl Nielsen in Athens, and initiated the Nikos Skalkottas Tage at the Konzerthaus Berlin.

Discography 

 1999: Piano Concerto No. 1 with the Iceland Symphony Orchestra
 2004: Piano Concerto No. 3 with the Caput Ensemble
 2005: Piano Concerto No. 2 with the BBC Symphony Orchestra

References

1959 births
Living people
Greek conductors (music)
Greek composers
Place of birth missing (living people)
21st-century conductors (music)